The women's high jump event at the 2007 Pan American Games was held on July 25.

Results

References
Official results

High
2007
2007 in women's athletics